Clock-comparison experiments are tests of the theory of relativity and may refer to:

Hafele–Keating experiment, comparing the drift in cesium beam atomic clocks on airplanes.
Hughes–Drever experiment, comparing energy levels of nucleons or electrons
Optical cavity tests, comparing laser frequencies
Pound–Rebka experiment, comparing clock rates to test gravitational redshift
Gravity Probe A, comparing clock rates to test gravitational redshift